Savage Republic (originally named Africa Corps) is an American, Los Angeles–based post-punk band, formed in the early 1980s and known for lengthy songs with an emphasis on percussion and droning guitars.

The group reformed in 2002 and remains active with a different lineup.

History
The band was originally named Africa Corps, and was formed by UCLA students Bruce Licher (guitar) and Mark Erskine (drums/percussion). They were joined by Philip Drucker (aka Jackson Del Rey), Robert Loveless, and Jeff Long. Shortly before the release of debut album Tragic Figures in 1982 (on Licher's own Independent Project label) they changed their name to Savage Republic. Licher was also responsible for the group's sleeve designs, which were hand-letterpressed and numbered by him.

In early 1983, they issued a single, "Film Noir", backed with a version of "O Andonis" by Greek composer Mikis Theodorakis (from the Costa-Gavras film Z), which garnered international attention.

The group split up towards the end of 1983 with a second album partially completed; Loveless and Drucker completed it and it was released as an album (Jedda by the Sea) by their side project 17 Pygmies. Tragic Figures was issued in Europe in 1984 on the Sordide Sentimental label. A 7-inch EP of material recorded in 1981, Tragic Figure, was also issued that year.

The band returned in 1985 with the album Ceremonial, followed in 1986 with the Trudge EP. A live double album was released in 1987. Brad Laner joined prior to the 1988 album Jamahiriya Democratique et Populaire de Sauvage, and a further studio album (Customs) was released prior to the band splitting up in 1990.

Licher continued to run his label, and received a Grammy nomination for the artwork for For Against's debut album. He formed Scenic in the mid-1990s, a group that also featured Loveless and former Shiva Burlesque member James Brenner. Laner went on to form Medicine.

Savage Republic reformed in 2002 with original member Licher and members from the mid-1980s including Greg Grunke, Thom Fuhrmann and Ethan Port, although Licher left after a first tour. The remaining members recorded the album 1938, released by Neurot Recordings in 2007.

Musical style
The band's music has been called industrial, with AllMusic's Richie Unterberger describing it as music that "grafted tribal percussion, industrial drones, and raga-like guitar lines together". Unusual percussion was a large part of their sound, incorporating oil cans and metal pipes. Trouser Press described the debut album as "a combination of industrial drone with deep machine-like swaths of dragging bass, Halloween horror-movie screams and some of the most delightfully tribal and tropical percussion found on disc". When the band reformed in 1985 they incorporated more Arabic influences. Later work also incorporated Greek influences. The band's music was described in Music USA: The Rough Guide as "hypnotic post-modern raga-rock instrumentals" and "clattering noise-rock jams".

Discography

Studio albums

Singles and EPs

Live albums

Compilation albums

Home videos

References

External links 
 Official Savage Republic website
 Savage Republic at Mobilization Records
 Savage Republic at LTM Recordings

Musical groups from Los Angeles
Punk rock groups from California
American industrial rock musical groups
American post-punk music groups
Musical groups established in 1982
Musical groups disestablished in 1989
Musical groups reestablished in 2004
1982 establishments in California